Shakespeare in Love is a 1998 romantic period comedy-drama film directed by John Madden, written by Marc Norman and Tom Stoppard, and produced by Harvey Weinstein. It stars Gwyneth Paltrow, Joseph Fiennes, Geoffrey Rush, Colin Firth, Ben Affleck and Judi Dench.

The film depicts a fictional love affair involving playwright William Shakespeare (Fiennes) and Viola de Lesseps (Paltrow) while Shakespeare was writing Romeo and Juliet. Several characters are based on historical figures, and many of the characters, lines, and plot devices allude to Shakespeare's plays.

Shakespeare in Love received acclaim from critics and was a box office success, grossing $289 million worldwide and becoming the ninth highest-grossing film of 1998. The film received numerous accolades, including seven Oscars at the 71st Academy Awards, including Best Picture, Best Actress (Paltrow), Best Supporting Actress (Dench), and Best Screenplay Written Directly for the Screen.

Plot
In 1593 London, William Shakespeare is a sometime player in the Lord Chamberlain's Men and playwright for Philip Henslowe, owner of The Rose Theatre. Suffering from writer's block with a new comedy, Romeo and Ethel, the Pirate's Daughter, Shakespeare attempts to seduce Rosaline, mistress of Richard Burbage, owner of the rival Curtain Theatre, and to convince Burbage to buy the play from Henslowe. Shakespeare receives advice from rival playwright Christopher Marlowe, but is despondent to learn Rosaline is sleeping with Master of the Revels Edmund Tilney. The desperate Henslowe, in debt to ruthless moneylender Fennyman, begins auditions anyway.

Viola de Lesseps, daughter of a wealthy merchant, who has seen Shakespeare's plays at court, disguises herself as a man named Thomas Kent to audition. Kent gains Shakespeare's interest with a speech from Two Gentlemen of Verona, but runs away when Shakespeare questions her. He pursues Kent to Viola's house and leaves a note with her nurse, asking Kent to begin rehearsals at the Rose.

Shakespeare sneaks into a ball at the house, where Viola's parents arrange her betrothal to Lord Wessex, an aristocrat in need of money. Dancing with Viola, Shakespeare is struck speechless. Confronted by Wessex, Shakespeare introduces himself as Christopher Marlowe. Wessex ejects "Marlowe" and threatens to kill him. Shakespeare finds Viola on her balcony, where they confess their mutual attraction before he is discovered by her nurse and flees.

Inspired by Viola, Shakespeare quickly transforms the play into what will become Romeo and Juliet. Rehearsals begin, with Thomas Kent as Romeo, the leading tragedian Ned Alleyn as Mercutio, and the stagestruck Fennyman in a small role. Shakespeare discovers Viola's true identity, and they begin a secret affair.

Viola is summoned to court to receive approval for her proposed marriage to Wessex. Shakespeare accompanies her, disguised as her nurse's female cousin, and anonymously persuades Wessex in public to wager £50 that a play can capture the true nature of love, the amount Shakespeare requires to buy a share in the Chamberlain's Men. Queen Elizabeth I declares that she will judge the matter.

Burbage learns Shakespeare has seduced Rosaline and cheated him out of payment for the play, and starts a brawl at the Rose with his company. The Rose players repel Burbage and his men and celebrate at the pub, where a drunken Henslowe lets slip to Viola that Shakespeare is married, albeit separated from his wife. News arrives that Marlowe has been murdered. A guilt-ridden Shakespeare assumes Wessex had Marlowe killed, believing him to be Viola's lover, while Viola believes Shakespeare to be the victim. Shakespeare appears at her church, allaying Viola's fears and terrifying Wessex, who believes he is a ghost. Viola confesses her love for Shakespeare, but both recognize she cannot escape her duty to marry Wessex.

John Webster, an unpleasant boy who hangs around the theatre, spies on Shakespeare and Viola making love and informs Tilney, who closes the Rose for breaking the ban on women actors. Viola's identity is exposed, leaving Shakespeare without a stage or a lead actor, until Burbage offers his theatre and the heartbroken Shakespeare takes the role of Romeo. Following her wedding, Viola learns the play will be performed that day, and runs away to the Curtain. She overhears that the boy playing Juliet cannot perform, his voice having broken, and Henslowe asks her to replace him. She plays Juliet to Shakespeare's Romeo to an enthralled audience.

Just after the play has concluded, Tilney arrives to arrest everyone for indecency due to Viola's presence, but the Queen reveals herself in attendance and restrains him, pretending that Kent is a man with a "remarkable resemblance" to a woman. Powerless to end a lawful marriage, she orders Viola to sail with Wessex to Virginia. The Queen also tells Wessex, who followed Viola to the theatre, that Romeo and Juliet has won the bet for Shakespeare, and has Kent deliver his £50 with instructions to write something "a little more cheerful next time, for Twelfth Night".

Viola and Shakespeare say their goodbyes, and he vows to immortalize her, as he imagines the beginning of Twelfth Night, in character as a castaway disguised as a man after a voyage to a strange land.

Cast

Production 
The original idea for Shakespeare in Love was suggested to screenwriter Marc Norman in the late 1980s by his son Zachary. Norman wrote a draft screenplay which he presented to director Edward Zwick, which attracted Julia Roberts, who agreed to play Viola. However, Zwick disliked Norman's screenplay and hired the playwright Tom Stoppard to improve it (Stoppard's first major success had been with the Shakespeare-themed play Rosencrantz and Guildenstern Are Dead).

The film went into production in 1991 at Universal, with Zwick as director, but although sets and costumes were in construction, Shakespeare had not yet been cast, because Roberts insisted that only Daniel Day-Lewis could play the role. Day-Lewis was uninterested, and when Roberts failed to persuade him, she withdrew from the film, six weeks before shooting was due to begin. Zwick and the studio had tried to hold chemistry tests between Roberts and several then-unknown actors, including Hugh Grant, Colin Firth, and Sean Bean, but Roberts either skipped the meetings or found faults with them all. The production went into turnaround, and Zwick was unable to persuade other studios to take up the screenplay. Canceling the film cost Universal $6 million.

Eventually, Zwick got Miramax interested in the screenplay, but Miramax chose John Madden as director. Miramax boss Harvey Weinstein acted as producer, and persuaded Ben Affleck to take a small role as Ned Alleyn. Kate Winslet was offered the role of Viola after the success of Titanic, but she rejected it to pursue independent films. Winona Ryder, Diane Lane and Robin Wright were also considered for the lead role.

Principal photography began on March 2, 1998, and ended on June 10, 1998.

The film was considerably reworked after the first test screenings. The scene with Shakespeare and Viola in the punt was re-shot, to make it more emotional, and some lines were re-recorded to clarify the reasons why Viola had to marry Wessex. The ending was re-shot several times, until Stoppard eventually came up with the idea of Viola suggesting to Shakespeare that their parting could inspire his next play.

Among the locations used in the production were Hatfield House, Hertfordshire (for the fireworks scene), Broughton Castle, Oxfordshire (which played the role of the de Lesseps mansion), the beach at Holkham in Norfolk, the chapel at Eton College, Berkshire, and the Great Hall of Middle Temple, London.

References to Elizabethan literature 
Much of the action of the film echoes that of Romeo and Juliet. Will and Viola play out the famous balcony and bedroom scenes; like Juliet, Viola has a witty nurse, and is separated from Will by a gulf of duty (although not the family enmity of the play: the "two households" of Romeo and Juliet are supposedly inspired by the two rival playhouses). In addition, the two lovers are equally "star-crossed"they are not ultimately destined to be together (since Viola is of rich and socially ambitious merchant stock and is promised to marry Lord Wessex, while Shakespeare himself is poor and already married). Rosaline, with whom Will is in love at the beginning of the film, is a namesake of Romeo's love-interest at the beginning of the play. There are references to earlier cinematic versions of Shakespeare, such as the balcony scene pastiching the Zeffirelli Romeo and Juliet.

Many other plot devices used in the film are common in Shakespearean comedies and other plays of the Elizabethan era: the Queen disguised as a commoner, the cross-dressing disguises, mistaken identities, the sword fight, the suspicion of adultery, the appearance of a ghost (cf. Macbeth), and the "play within a play". According to Douglas Brode, the film deftly portrays many of these devices as though the events depicted were the inspiration for Shakespeare's own use of them in his plays.

Christopher Marlowe is presented in the film as the master playwright whom the characters consider the greatest English dramatist of that time – this is historically accurate, yet also humorous, since the film's audience knows what will eventually happen to Shakespeare's reputation. Marlowe gives Shakespeare a plot for his next play, "Romeo and Ethel the Pirate's Daughter" ("Romeo is Italian...always in and out of love...until he meets...Ethel. The daughter of his enemy! His best friend is killed in a duel by Ethel's brother or something. His name is Mercutio.") Marlowe's Doctor Faustus is quoted repeatedly: "Was this the face that launched a thousand ships/ And burned the topless towers of Ilium?" A reference is also made to Marlowe's final, unfinished play The Massacre at Paris in a scene wherein Marlowe (Rupert Everett) seeks payment for the final act of the play from Richard Burbage (Martin Clunes). Burbage promises the payment the next day, so Marlowe refuses to part with the pages and departs for Deptford, where he is killed. The only surviving text of The Massacre at Paris is an undated octavo that is probably too short to represent the complete original play. It has been suggested that it is a memorial reconstruction by the actors who performed the work.

The child John Webster (Joe Roberts), who plays with rats, is a reference to a leading figure in the next, Jacobean, generation of playwrights. His plays (The Duchess of Malfi, The White Devil) are known for their 'blood and gore', which is humorously referred to by the child saying that he enjoys Titus Andronicus, and also saying of Romeo and Juliet, when asked his opinion by the Queen, "I liked it when she stabbed herself."

When the clown Will Kempe (Patrick Barlow) says to Shakespeare that he would like to play in a drama, he is told that "they would laugh at Seneca if you played it", a reference to the Roman tragedian renowned for his sombre and bloody plot lines which were a major influence on the development of English tragedy.

Will is shown signing a paper repeatedly, with many relatively illegible signatures visible. This is a reference to the fact that several versions of Shakespeare's signature exist, and in each one he spelled his name differently.

Plot precedents and similarities 
After the film's release, certain publications, including Private Eye, noted strong similarities between the film and the 1941 novel No Bed for Bacon, by Caryl Brahms and S. J. Simon, which also features Shakespeare falling in love and finding inspiration for his later plays. In a foreword to a subsequent edition of No Bed for Bacon (which traded on the association by declaring itself "A Story of Shakespeare and Lady Viola in Love") Ned Sherrin, Private Eye insider and former writing partner of Brahms', confirmed that he had lent a copy of the novel to Stoppard after he joined the writing team, but that the basic plot of the film had been independently developed by Marc Norman, who was unaware of the earlier work.

The film's plot can claim a tradition in fiction reaching back to Alexandre Duval's "Shakespeare amoureux ou la Piece a l'Etude" (1804), in which Shakespeare falls in love with an actress who is playing Richard III.

The writers of Shakespeare in Love were sued in 1999 by bestselling author Faye Kellerman. She claimed that the plotline was stolen from her 1989 novel The Quality of Mercy, in which Shakespeare romances a Jewish woman who dresses as a man, and attempts to solve a murder. Miramax Films spokesman Andrew Stengel derided the claim, filed in the US District Court six days before the 1999 Academy Awards, as "absurd", and argued that the timing "suggests a publicity stunt". An out-of-court settlement was reached, but the sum agreed between the parties indicates that the claim was "unwarranted".

Historical inaccuracies 
The film is "not constrained by worries about literary or historical accuracy" and includes anachronisms such as a reference to Virginia tobacco plantations, at a time before the Colony of Virginia existed. A leading character is an Earl of Wessex, a title which in Shakespeare's time had not existed for over 500 years. Queen Elizabeth I never entered a public theatre, as she does in the film. Between Romeo and Juliet and Twelfth Night, Shakespeare wrote ten other plays over a period of six years. Another historical liberty concerns the central theme of Shakespeare struggling to create the story of Romeo and Juliet, as in real life he simply adapted an existing story for theatre. Arthur Brooke translated the Italian verse tale The Tragical History of Romeus and Juliet into English in 1562, 32 years before Shakespeare's Romeo and Juliet.

Reception 
Janet Maslin made the film an "NYT Critics' Pick", calling it "pure enchantment". According to Maslin, "Gwyneth Paltrow, in her first great, fully realized starring performance, makes a heroine so breathtaking that she seems utterly plausible as the playwright's guiding light." Roger Ebert, who gave the film four stars out of four, wrote: "The contemporary feel of the humor (like Shakespeare's coffee mug, inscribed 'Souvenir of Stratford-Upon-Avon') makes the movie play like a contest between Masterpiece Theatre and Mel Brooks. Then the movie stirs in a sweet love story, juicy court intrigue, backstage politics and some lovely moments from Romeo and Juliet... Is this a movie or an anthology? I didn't care. I was carried along by the wit, the energy and a surprising sweetness."

Rotten Tomatoes gives the film a 92% approval rating based on 141 critical reviews, with an average rating of 8.30/10. The website's critical consensus states: "Endlessly witty, visually rapturous, and sweetly romantic, Shakespeare in Love is a delightful romantic comedy that succeeds on nearly every level." On Metacritic, the film holds a score of 87 out of 100 based on 33 critical reviews, indicating "universal acclaim".

Shakespeare in Love was among 1999's box office number-one films in the United Kingdom. The U.S. box office reached over $100 million; including the box office from the rest of the world, the film took in over $289 million.

The Sunday Telegraph claimed that the film prompted the revival of the title of Earl of Wessex. Prince Edward was originally to have been titled Duke of Cambridge following his marriage to Sophie Rhys-Jones in 1999, the year after the film's release. However, after watching Shakespeare in Love, he reportedly became attracted to the title of the character played by Colin Firth, and asked his mother Queen Elizabeth II to be given the title of Earl of Wessex instead.

In the wake of sexual abuse allegations against Weinstein, many of the cast and crew began to distance themselves from the producer and his past behavior. Madden, while condemning Weinstein, stated that the producer "craved power and had power and, as we now know, he was using it in ways that are repugnant and should be utterly condemned".

Best Picture and Best Actress Oscar controversy 
Shakespeare In Love won the Best Picture Oscar at the 71st Academy Awards, controversially beating critically favored Saving Private Ryan and becoming the first comedy to win the award since Annie Hall (1977). The Academy's decision was criticized by many for awarding the film over Saving Private Ryan, and Gwyneth Paltrow winning Best Actress over frontrunner Cate Blanchett for Elizabeth.

Many industry pundits speculated that this win was attributed to the awards campaign led by Weinstein. Weinstein was reported to have strong-armed the movie's talent into participating in an unprecedented blitzkrieg of press. Terry Press, an executive at DreamWorks at the time, stated that Weinstein and Miramax "tried to get everybody to believe that Saving Private Ryan was all in the first 15 minutes". Mark Gill, an executive at Miramax at the time, claimed that Weinstein had a reliance on relatively cheap publicity. He stated, "This was not saying to the stars, 'O.K., you can go on a couple of talk shows to open the movie and do a weekend of interviews at a junket and thanks so much for helping, Gill said. "That was just 'Good morning. You've got three more months of shaking hands and kissing babies in you.

In 2015, The Hollywood Reporter magazine, claiming to have interviewed "hundreds" of Academy members, indicated that, having to choose between Shakespeare in Love and Saving Private Ryan, a majority of them would award the Oscar for Best Picture to the latter.

Accolades 

In 2005, the Writers Guild of America ranked its script the 28th greatest ever written.

American Film Institute recognition:
 AFI's 100 Years...100 Passions – #50

Stage adaptation

Lee Hall's Shakespeare in Love 

In November 2011, Variety reported that Disney Theatrical Productions intended to produce a stage version of the film in London with Sonia Friedman Productions. The production was officially announced in November 2013. Based on the film screenplay by Norman and Stoppard, it was adapted for the stage by Lee Hall. The production was directed by Declan Donnellan and designed by Nick Ormerod, the joint founders of Cheek by Jowl.

The production opened at the Noël Coward Theatre in London's West End on 23 July 2014, receiving rave reviews from critics. It was called "A joyous celebration of theatre" in the Daily Telegraph, "Joyous" in The Independent, and "A love letter to theatre" in The Guardian.

Japanese Adaptation 
From December 2016 to January 2017, Shakespeare of True Love, a Japanese adaptation of Shakespeare in Love written by Shigeki Motoiki and Sakurako Fukuyama, was produced in Kanagawa Arts Theatre. It was not related to Lee Hall's play. Takaya Kamikawa played Will Shakespeare and Alisa Mizuki played Viola.

See also
 BFI Top 100 British films

References

External links 

 
 
 
 
 
 
 
 Official website for stage adaptation

1998 films
1990s historical romance films
1998 romantic comedy-drama films
American historical romance films
American romantic comedy-drama films
British historical romance films
British romantic comedy-drama films
BAFTA winners (films)
Best Film BAFTA Award winners
Best Musical or Comedy Picture Golden Globe winners
Best Picture Academy Award winners
Cross-dressing in American films
Cross-dressing in British films
Films about actors
Films about Elizabeth I
Films about William Shakespeare
Films based on Romeo and Juliet
Films directed by John Madden
Films featuring a Best Actress Academy Award-winning performance
Films featuring a Best Musical or Comedy Actress Golden Globe winning performance
Films featuring a Best Supporting Actress Academy Award-winning performance
Films produced by Harvey Weinstein
Films produced by David Parfitt
Films set in London
Films set in the 1590s
Films set in Tudor England
Films that won the Best Costume Design Academy Award
Films that won the Best Original Score Academy Award
Films whose art director won the Best Art Direction Academy Award
Films whose writer won the Best Original Screenplay Academy Award
Miramax films
Films with screenplays by Tom Stoppard
Films scored by Stephen Warbeck
Universal Pictures films
Films adapted into plays
1998 comedy films
1998 drama films
Films about writers
1990s English-language films
1990s American films
1990s British films
Casting controversies in film
Film controversies
1999 controversies
1999 controversies in the United States
Film controversies in the United States
Obscenity controversies in film
Advertising and marketing controversies in film